Šoporňa is a village and municipality in Galanta District of  the Trnava Region of south-west Slovakia.

History
In historical records the village was first mentioned in 1251, when it was called Supurni. The name is recorded as Soporny in 1411 and as Sopornok in 1420. The town became an autonomous settlement during the seventeenth century with local administrative work having its own seal. By the end of eighteenth century, it was a town with 295 houses and almost 2,000 inhabitants.

Geography
The municipality lies at an elevation of 129 metres and covers an area of 31.394 km². It has a population of around 4,200 people.

Street names 
 Šaľská
 Sereďská
 Nitrianska
 Československej armády
 Jana Amosa Komenského
 Argentínska
 Družstevná
 Nábrežná
 Novozámocká
 Slnečná
 Fučíkova
 Mlynská
 Lesná
 Vážska
 Poštová
 Červenej armády
 Mládežnícka
 Dukelská
 Krásna
 Kapitána Nálepku
 Gottwaldova
 Mierová
 Fazuľová
 Vladimíra Iľjiča Lenina
 Nešporova
 Kollárova
 Krátka
 Budovateľská
 Gagarinova
 Stromová

Architectural monument

The chapel of St. Anna is an architectural monument in Soporna. The chapel was built in 1750. Reconstruction of the building has occurred to keep it in good condition.

See also
 List of municipalities and towns in Slovakia

References

External links

 Official page
https://web.archive.org/web/20070513023228/http://www.statistics.sk/mosmis/eng/run.html

Villages and municipalities in Galanta District